Anne Marie Thérèse of Lorraine (30 July 1648 – 1661), was a Princess of Lorraine and was later a Princess Abbess of the Imperial Remiremont Abbey in France. She was the daughter of Nicholas Francis, Duke of Lorraine, and Claude Françoise de Lorraine.

She was a minor during her entire rule and Remiremont was ruled by the Dame Doyenne, Hélène d'Anglure, and the Dame Sonière Bernarde de Cléron de Saffre (fl. 1704).

References 
 http://www.guide2womenleaders.com/womeninpower/Womeninpower1640.htm

1648 births
1661 deaths
Abbesses of Remiremont
Anne Marie Therese de Lorraine
Anne Marie Therese de Lorraine
Royalty and nobility who died as children